Attila (406–453) was a king of the Huns in the 5th century.

Attila may also refer to:
 Attila (name)

Film and television

 Attila (1954 film), an Italian-French co-production
 Attila (miniseries), a 2001 American miniseries starring Gerard Butler

Literature
 Attila (novel), a 1975 novel by Klas Östergren
 Attila, an 1837 novel by G. P. R. James

Music
 Attila (rock band), a late-1960s American duo that included Billy Joel
 Attila (metalcore band), an American group from Atlanta, Georgia
 Attila (heavy metal band), a band from New York City
 Attila (album), a 1979 album by Mina
 "Attila", a song by Iced Earth from The Glorious Burden

Stage
 Attila (play), a 1667 production by Pierre Corneille
 Attila (opera), an 1846 work by Giuseppe Verdi

Other uses
 Attila (automobile), a brand of automobiles
 Attila (bird), a genus of tropical birds
 Attila (horse), a British Thoroughbred racehorse
 Attila, Illinois
 1489 Attila, an asteroid
 Total War: Attila, a 2015 video game
 Mount Conner or Attila, a mountain in central Australia

See also
 Atila (disambiguation)
 Atilla (disambiguation)
 Attila Marcel, a 2013 French comedy film by Sylvain Chomet
 Attila the Hun (disambiguation)
 Attila the Stockbroker (born 1957), British punk poet
 Operation Attila (disambiguation)